The Fox River Paper Company Historic District, now known as the Historic Fox River Mills, is a complex of paper mill buildings in Appleton, Wisconsin, United States, built from 1883 to 1915.  The historic district includes the Romanesque-styled Ravine/Rag Mills, the Italianate-styled Lincoln Mill which originally milled flour, and the Italianate-styled Fox River Mill. The site is now used as apartments but also retains a functioning hydroelectric canal and privately-owned generating station.  This hydroelectric infrastructure continues a tradition of electricity from water power dating from the 1880's which makes the Lower Fox River the oldest hydroelectric generation region in the United States.

References

External links 
 Apartment web site

Buildings and structures in Appleton, Wisconsin
Industrial buildings and structures on the National Register of Historic Places in Wisconsin
National Register of Historic Places in Outagamie County, Wisconsin
Pulp and paper companies of the United States
Apartment buildings in Wisconsin
Industrial buildings completed in 1915
Lists of buildings and structures in Wisconsin